"Him" is the sixth episode of the seventh and final season of the television series Buffy the Vampire Slayer.

Plot
Xander introduces a reluctant Spike to his new living environment: Xander's apartment. Buffy tries to convince an equally reluctant Xander that Spike needs their help and a place better than the school basement to live. Buffy and Dawn talk privately about Buffy's feelings for Spike and why she is helping him in light of the pain he has caused her. Dawn starts to rant about love and relationships and Buffy leaves so she can return to work. Dawn then sees an attractive jock named R.J. on the football field and falls in love with him.

Buffy fights with and kills a demon at Anya's apartment that was sent by D'Hoffryn. Anya thanks her, but does not want to appear weak. Buffy explains that the gang needs Anya's help and she wants to protect her friends, Anya included. At the high school, Dawn awkwardly tries to start a conversation with R.J., who is discussing cheerleader tryouts with another player, O'Donnell, and two cheerleaders. Later, Dawn tries out for the cheerleading team wearing Buffy's old cheerleading uniform, but she falls and makes a fool out of herself. At home that night, Dawn locks herself in the bathroom and cuts up the cheerleading uniform while Buffy tries to get her to come out.

Buffy tries to offer help and support, but considering Buffy's track record with guys, Dawn is not interested. The next day at school, Dawn overhears O'Donnell inform R.J. that he will not be starting quarterback for the game and she confronts O'Donnell. She yells at him at first, but then in a moment of anger, she shoves him and he falls down a flight of stairs. Dawn has a meeting with Principal Wood and Buffy about the incident and informs them that the jock just tripped and fell down the stairs. Buffy realizes though that Dawn may have been motivated by her love for R.J. and actually pushed O'Donnell down the stairs.

R.J. catches up with Dawn after her meeting and asks her out on a date. At the Bronze, the gang sit around and talk about Spike's progress at Xander's place as they are shocked to see R.J. dancing with a "slutty-looking" Dawn. Buffy confronts her sister about her clothes and behavior, but Dawn acts stubborn. Unable to get past Buffy to return to the dance floor, Dawn leaves and encounters one of the cheerleader girls in the alley. They begin to fight over R.J. and have to be broken up by Buffy.

After watching Wood lecture R.J. about not doing his own homework, Buffy attempts to lecture R.J. about the way he treats girls but, quickly, she finds herself falling in love with him. Buffy catches Dawn as she returns home that night and tells her about her meeting with R.J. Buffy offers encouragement to her sister by explaining that she has a chance with R.J. and that he really likes her.

At school the next day, Buffy pulls R.J. out of class and takes him to an empty room. While Dawn walks the halls searching for R.J., Buffy adoringly listens to R.J. talk about football and his troubles at school and then starts passionately kissing him just as Dawn peeks into the room. Dawn runs outside in tears and into Xander, who is surprised to find Buffy on top of R.J. and promptly takes her home for a much-needed intervention with the others. At the Summers house, that night, Buffy and Dawn fight about their love with R.J., while Xander, Willow and Anya try to keep the peace until they can reverse the love spell obviously affecting the sisters; Xander recalling an incident he had with a backfired love spell meant for Cordelia.

Willow searches for information on R.J. and instead finds information on R.J.'s older brother, Lance, who Xander remembers from high school. Xander and Spike go to find R.J.'s brother and despite his popular status at high school, he is not quite his attractive, popular self anymore. After some chatting, the guys realize that R.J.'s jacket has been handed down through the family. R.J. shows up at Buffy's house looking for her, but Willow and Anya tell him to leave. As R.J. walks away, Willow and Anya start to look at him lovingly and then argue about which of them he loves more. Buffy and Dawn jump into the fight, and soon Dawn is hurt and depressed that her friends and sister are taking her guy away, while the other three plot to win R.J. Buffy goes to kill Wood with her old rocket launcher, Willow works on a spell to make R.J. a woman, Anya takes off to rob banks and Dawn lays herself across the railroad tracks.

Xander stops Willow from completing her spell and then brings her along to stop Buffy from killing Wood. Spike tackles Buffy before she can kill the principal and confiscates the weapon from her. Using Willow's locator spell, they find Dawn on the railroad tracks just as a train is headed for her. Buffy jumps in and rescues her sister just before the train hits; scared at the thought of losing her sister, Buffy shows that the spell was not that strong, and admits that she is willing to give up R.J. if it means that much to Dawn. Finally, Xander and Spike jump R.J. on the street and steal his jacket, then burn it in the fireplace at the Summers home. All the girls feel terrible about the way they acted and the things they almost did. Willow questions what Anya did to prove her love to R.J.; Anya dodges the subject with a quick lie and turns off the radio as a news report is heard about a wanted bank robber on the loose.

References

External links

 

Buffy the Vampire Slayer (season 7) episodes
2002 American television episodes